The IBM ThinkPad T30 is a laptop computer manufactured by IBM.

Hardware 
This model was equipped with mobile implementation of Pentium 4 CPU, and high power consumption of Intel chip was a reasonable point for designing this model as the heaviest and most bulky T series ThinkPad of IBM era.

ThinkPad T30 was the last classic ThinkPad with a battery with bottom placement, was the first 14.1" ThinkPad with  screen option and first T series ThinkPad with touchpad option.

The new platform with Intel processor also include the new Intel 845MP Chipset, and ATI Mobility Radeon 7500 video controller with 16 MB graphics memory, and up to 1 GB PC2100 RAM (maximum according to IBM manual, but it has been reported to accept 2 GB of RAM) with 256 MB as standard memory. When the processor ranging from 1.6 GHz to 2.0 GHz, A T30 may accommodate up to a 2.4 GHz processor only with the latest BIOS and Embedded Controller upgrades. Graphics are provided by ATI Radeon, which supports external Full-HD resolutions: users have even reported success with output resolutions of 1920 × 1200 via DVI on the optional Port Replicator II docking station, although IBM officially claims a limit of 1280 × 1024 due to a weak TMDS transmitter. Features available include the embedded security subsystem, a 20, 40 or 60 GB hard disk, Ultrabay Plus drive or additional battery option instead of DVD-ROM, wireless (with miniPCI slot usable for a wireless card), and Bluetooth.

Reception 
The notebook was favorably received by TechRepublic; and the ZDnet praises the good performance and relatively compact case for a NetBurst-based laptop.

See also 

 ThinkPad A30 series - 15" contemporary models
 ThinkPad R30 series - 14" low-cost contemporary model

References 

IBM laptops
ThinkPad